Tsander can refer to:

Friedrich Zander (1887–1933), Soviet rocket engineer
Tsander (crater), a Moon crater named after Friedrich Zander
Volha Tsander (born 1976), Belarusian hammer thrower